The Soko or Soko–Kele languages are a clade of Bantu languages coded Zone C.50–60 in Guthrie's classification. According to Nurse & Philippson (2003), apart from Mongo (Nkundo), the languages form a valid node. They are:
 (C50) Mbesa, Soko (So), Poke, Lombo, Kele (Lokele, incl. Foma); (C60) Ngando (incl. Lalia)

Maho (2009) adds Likile and Linga to C50. Ethnologue notes a Bantu but otherwise unclassified Moingi language on the river in the middle of Soko–Kele territory.

Footnotes

References